NGC 166 (also known as PGC 2143) is a spiral galaxy located around 2.6 million light-years away in the constellation Cetus, with an apparent magnitude of 15.18. It was discovered by Francis Preserved Leavenworth in 1886.

See also 
 Spiral galaxy 
 List of NGC objects (1–1000)
 Cetus (constellation)

References

External links 
 
 SEDS

Astronomical objects discovered in 1886
Cetus (constellation)
0166
002143
Discoveries by Francis Leavenworth
Spiral galaxies